The Showdown is an Australian rules football  game played by the two Australian Football League (AFL) teams from South Australia, the Adelaide and Port Adelaide football clubs. The first AFL premiership fixture between the two clubs took place on 20 April 1997.

The South Australian Brewing Company, makers of West End beers, were the first sponsors of the game and decided that the "Showdown" would be an appropriate name as a promotional opportunity for games between these two clubs, since it was the first time two South Australian teams had played against each other in the AFL.

The rivalry between Adelaide and Port Adelaide is often considered the best, and most bitter, in the Australian Football League with Malcolm Blight, Australian Football Hall of Fame Legend, stating in 2009 that "there is no doubt it is the greatest rivalry in football." The head-to-head count between the two clubs only include AFL premiership matches.

Background

First South Australian AFL licence 
In 1982 the SANFL approached the VFL in regards to entering two sides, Port Adelaide and longtime major rival , in the Victorian league. This action was also taken by WAFL club East Perth in 1980. All approaches were ignored by the VFL at the time with the reason given by Jack Hamilton being that the VFL clubs thought that one or two SANFL teams would end up being too strong later admitting that they also wanted to continue to poach the states best players, which would soon include Craig Bradley and Stephen Kernahan in 1986. 1982 also saw the first instance of the VFL expanding beyond Melbourne and Geelong with the South Melbourne Football Club being relocated to Sydney. The Port Adelaide Football Club's annual report from late 1982 showed that the failure of the attempts made by South Australian and West Australian clubs to enter the VFL significantly impacted the club's understanding of its future. From this point Port Adelaide restructured the club in regards to economics, public relations and on-field performance for an attempt to enter the league in 1990. There was genuine feeling that failure to do this would result in the club ceasing to exist in the future.
In 1985 Port Adelaide registered itself as a national football club. Sentiment at this time amongst the direction of Australian rules football in South Australia was succinctly encapsulated by a Michael Robinson article in the 1985 Football Times Yearbook that previewed the SANFL's upcoming season. In that article Robinson wrote about the disappointment of the equal gate sharing of match takings enforced by the SANFL for the upcoming season with the stronger South Australian clubs propping up ailing clubs such as Woodville.

The following year the SANFL registered the name "Adelaide Football Club" in 1986 but ended up deciding against entering a team into the VFL. In 1986 Norwood Football Club made an independent approach to the VFL with entry into the league discussed in great detail but these discussions ultimately failed to materialise. In 1987 the West Coast Eagles and Brisbane Bears were admitted to the Victorian Football League leaving South Australia as the only mainland state without representation in the VFL.

By 1989 seven out of ten SANFL clubs were recording losses and the combined income of the SANFL and WAFL had dropped to 40% of that of the VFL. The 1989 Port Adelaide annual report and November newsletter contrasted with the outlook of other SANFL and WAFL clubs.
During early 1990 the SANFL had decided to wait three years before making any further decision. Frustrated with lack of progress, Port Adelaide were having secret negotiations in the town of Quorn for entry in 1991. Around the same time AFL was also seeking Norwood to join the national competition in 1990. However Norwood would eventually side with the SANFL after seeing the media reaction to Port Adelaide's attempts.

When the knowledge of Port Adelaide Football Club's negotiations to gain an AFL licence were made public, the other SANFL clubs saw it as an act of treachery. Subsequently, the SANFL clubs, led by Glenelg and Norwood, urged Justice Olssen to make an injunction against the bid, which he agreed to. The SANFL promptly created a composite team to beat Port Adelaide's bid. The Adelaide Football Club gained what was very close to being Port Adelaide's licence to the AFL and began playing in 1991. The new Adelaide club would adopt the name  "the Crows" after the states inhabitants often used the nickname "Crow-eaters". During this time the SANFL began suing people involved with Port Adelaide, including people volunteering in unpaid positions, with the AFL quickly stepping in to guarantee the protection of the club and associated people. In 2014 during an interview with the Adelaide Advertiser, Ross Oakley revealed that "In desperation to force (the SANFL's) hand...we began dealing directly with two powerhouse clubs of the SANFL, Norwood and Port Adelaide...we were changing the league's name to AFL – and we could not go without a team from Adelaide." 

The front runners for the coaching job at the newly created club were both involved in the last SANFL game played in South Australia before the advent of a local AFL team, the 1990 SANFL Grand Final. In that game Port Adelaide, coached by John Cahill defeated Glenelg, coached by Graham Cornes, by 15 points. Graham Cornes ended up being selected to coach Adelaide for the 1991 AFL season. Cornes compiled a club list of the best players from South Australia, with few originating from other states, in what was almost a state side in the first year. Chris McDermott, captain of Glenelg in the 1990 SANFL Grand Final, was designated as the Crows inaugural captain. Despite Port Adelaide being SANFL premiers in 1990, only 5 players from the team became part of the Adelaide squad of 52. Those players being Bruce Abernethy, Simon Tregenza, David Brown, Darren Smith and Scott Hodges, with the last three joining Port Adelaide's inaugural AFL squad in 1997.

In 1992 Port Adelaide played a young Adelaide side in a pre-season match at Football Park on February 1 in what was the first meeting between the two clubs.

Second South Australian AFL licence 
The admission of Adelaide to the AFL had a devastating impact on the leagues attendances with the SANFL recording a 45% drop between 1990 and 1993. Port Adelaide defied this trend of falling SANFL attendances recording an increase of 13% from 1990 to 1993.

In 1994 the AFL announced that South Australia would receive a licence for a second team based in the state. The major bids competing with Port Adelaide this time around were from merger club proposals in Norwood-Sturt, and Glenelg-South. On 15 June the SANFL handed down a report recommending the second license go to a team formed from the amalgamation of two clubs.

On 16 June it was reported in The Age by Stephen Linnell that "the League's preference was for a single, established club to join the league". The final tenders were submitted to the SANFL on 14 September 1994 including Port Adelaide's second application, Norwood–Sturt's merged club bid with the remaining application coming from Woodville–West Torrens.

On 2 October Port Adelaide won the 1994 SANFL Grand Final, its fifth in seven years. On 13 December Port Adelaide won the tender for the second SA license over its various state rivals, however it was prevented from entering the competition before 1996 as stipulated in the Adelaide license agreement. In 1995 after an SANFL game at Football Park the Adelaide Crows began carrying out a training session which was interrupted by a large horde of Port Adelaide supporters chanting "We're coming to get you". Adelaide coach Robert Shaw was the only Adelaide official to confront the horde. In 1996 Port Adelaide was left to wait again as a vacancy was required in the league.

It was announced on 27 October 1995 that Port Adelaide would be participating in the 1997 AFL season as Port Power, one season later than initially planned and seven years after the clubs first failed bid in 1990.

Other contributing factors to rivalry 
Along with the circumstances of the two clubs entries into the national competition are numerous other factors that fuel the rivalry.

Lingering resentment 
 
Many supporters of traditionally strong South Australian clubs other than Port Adelaide, such as Norwood, Sturt, Glenelg and North Adelaide, were left frustrated that Port Adelaide were the only SANFL club to make the transition to the AFL.

Player recruitment 

Due to the inherent nature of being the only two South Australian clubs in the competition, when a player seeks to move to the state both clubs often vigorously compete for the players signature. This also applies during the AFL Draft when both clubs will jostle for position to gain local talent. Two notable examples of this characteristic were the bidding wars between the two clubs for Steven Motlop and Jordan Dawson. Both players in their first Showdown appearances, Motlop for Port Adelaide after leaving Geelong and Dawson for Adelaide after leaving Sydney, kicked match winning goals for their new clubs.

Guernsey issues 
In 2005 for the AFL's Heritage Round, Adelaide decided to wear an iteration of the South Australian state guernsey, with the 'AFC' monogram instead of the 'SA' monogram, which was originally worn in 1930. During the same match Port Adelaide were blocked by the AFL from wearing the club's Prison Bar guernsey.

In February 2014, Adelaide announced that they would wear the South Australian state guernsey in the first Showdown at Adelaide Oval. This left Port Adelaide fans particularly aggrieved as many of their greats had worn the South Australia guernsey in the past. Port Adelaide released a statement at the time saying that the state guernsey was "a symbol of South Australian football unification, not division". Others commented that it would be misappropriation to use a State guernsey for a club based competition with players who came from interstate being forced to wear a symbol of South Australia.

Shortly after unveiling the guernsey, Adelaide were denied permission to wear it by the SANFL. Port Adelaide meanwhile were granted permission by the AFL to wear their traditional "Prison Bar" guernsey for the only Showdown in 2020, as part of the club's 150th anniversary celebrations. The club requested it wear the guernsey in all future matches between the teams, which was rejected by Collingwood and the AFL. The club negotiated an agreement with Collingwood to return the guernsey for the 2023 home Showdown match.

Competitiveness 
The Showdown has a history of upsets with ladder ranking and betting markets being a poor indicator of the final result. As of Showdown 44, over a third of meetings have gone the way of the lower ranked team. In addition to this the overall head-to-head lead has been held by both teams at different stages, has never gone beyond a differential of 6 and, as of Showdown 51 has Port Adelaide leading by only a single win. This contrasts with the Western Derby where West Coast have never relinquished the lead of the head-to-head ledger and have at some stages held a 12 win differential over Fremantle and the Sydney Derby where the Sydney Swans have also never relinquished the lead of the head-to-head ledger and held a 7 win differential over the GWS Giants after 9 meetings.

Notable matches

Round 4, 1997 

The build up to the inaugural Showdown was described by Malcolm Blight as being akin to a Grand Final. Having won their first match in the AFL against Geelong the week before, a pumped up Port jumped the Crows in the first half and managed to hold on in the final quarter as the Crows mounted a comeback. Port Adelaide eventually defeated Adelaide by 11 points. The game notably also featured a fight between Port's Scott Cummings and Adelaide's Rod Jameson. Dennis Cometti, commentator for the inaugural Showdown, later elaborated on his chameleon comment saying that when Adelaide entered the AFL some Port Adelaide supporters began to follow the new team as it was the only South Australian club competing on the national stage, but six years after their original club attempted to do the same, they reverted to supporting Port Adelaide after they won the first showdown.

Round 5, 2002 

The round 5, 2002 Showdown was the second time in a row Port Adelaide had won by 8 points. After the game about six players from both sides coincidentally came across each other at the Ramsgate Hotel in Henley Beach. During the match Josh Carr had been tagging Mark Ricciuto holding him to only 6 kicks (for comparison Ricciuto averaged 13 over his career). When the groups of players met at the Ramsgate Hotel, the two aforementioned players started an argument, and with the assistance of alcohol, a brawl between the two groups broke out. No one was badly injured. The publicity of this incident resulted in consecutive Showdown crowds in excess of 50,000 at Football Park. John Reid, former head of Adelaide Football Operations, was required (like his Port Adelaide counterpart) by the AFL to provide his players with a formal lecture regarding how the incident was unacceptable which upon completion he famously quipped "And I hope you won the fight!”.

Round 7, 2004 
Showdown XV is memorable for the magnitude of the upset that Adelaide pulled off and the fact that it ended Port Adelaide's 7 game winning streak in Showdowns. At the start of the game Port Adelaide had won 5 of its first 6 games whilst Adelaide had only managed one. The gambling markets had Adelaide at $5 to win the match, the longest odds offered in any Showdown at the time. Port Adelaide entered the first break with a 6-point lead but Adelaide coach Gary Ayres gave his side a spray and subsequently ran away with the game to cause arguably the biggest upset in Showdown history.

2005 semi-final 
In the 2005 AFL Finals Series, Adelaide and Port Adelaide met in a semi-final, the first time, and thus far only time in their history they had played against each other in a finals game. The stakes of a showdown had never been higher and South Australia experienced an unprecedented high anticipation to the game in the week leading up to the match. The match was known in the buildup as "The Ultimate Showdown". The first half of the game was an intense, defensive contest with the Crows leading 4.7 (31) to 3.6 (24) at the main break. Tempers almost boiled over in the second quarter after Adelaide ruckman Rhett Biglands was stretchered from the ground after a Byron Pickett shirtfront. However Biglands would return in the second half and the incident would eventually be deemed legal. After half time, Adelaide thrashed Port Adelaide outscoring them by 76 points cruising home for an 83-point win, ending Port Adelaide's season. This remains as the only final played between the two sides and the only final the two would ever play at Football Park. 2005 was also the only time one of the clubs had defeated the other side in 3 Showdowns in the same AFL season.

Round 3, 2008 
Showdown 24 is often cited as the most physical meeting of the two clubs. Prior to Showdown 24 Port Adelaide had lost their two opening games of the 2008 AFL season and, coupled with their disastrous 2007 AFL Grand Final, Mark Williams demanded throughout the week at training leading up to the game that his players bring tough and physical brand of football to their next match. Early in the game, and a sign of things to come, Matt Thomas knocked out Nathan Bassett. Not long after Luke Jericho was bruised after a heavy collision with Port Adelaide ruckman Dean Brogan. In the last quarter Adelaide had four injured players on the bench resulting in Port Adelaide gaining all the momentum, kicking the last three goals of the match, with Daniel Motlop bringing the margin to 6 points with two minutes remaining. Despite this Adelaide managed to just hold on, despite losing a significant number of players, and limp to the siren for a win. The final 6-point margin was, at the time, the smallest in Showdown history and the result evened the ledger for the first time since 2000.

Round 19, 2013 

In 2013 Port Adelaide beat Adelaide in the final Showdown to be played at Football Park. The game was also memorable for Port Adelaide's late final quarter charge, coming back from 20 points in the last 6 minutes of the game. This included a goal by Angus Monfries from outside 50 that landed just in front of the Port Adelaide's point line, bounced at right angles and went through for a goal. Chad Wingard kicked his fifth goal in the last 28 seconds to hand Port Adelaide the lead and win. Port Adelaide winning this match meant the club had won the first, last and most Showdowns played at Football Park.

Round 2, 2014 
The round 2, 2014 Showdown on 29 March 2014 saw the first Showdown played at Adelaide Oval along with the first game of Australian rules football at the venue since its extensive redevelopment. Port Adelaide led from the start, with Matthew Lobbe kicking the first goal in an Adelaide Oval Showdown but Adelaide mounted a comeback and claimed the lead briefly in the third. After the halfway mark of the third quarter, Port Adelaide ran away with the game winning by 55 points.

Round 16, 2015 
The round 16, 2015 Showdown on 19 July 2015 had added significance due to the recent death of Crows senior coach Phil Walsh, who spent ten years as an assistant in two stints with Port Adelaide, including their 2004 premiership. The game lived up to expectation, with the Crows holding on desperately in the last quarter to win by three points, the closest margin in a Showdown. The game was played in front of 53,518, the largest attendance at the venue since the 1973 SANFL Grand Final. Scott Thompson was awarded the one off Phillip Walsh Medal, presented by Walsh's daughter Quinn.

Round 8, 2018 

The round 8, 2018 Showdown held on 12 May 2018 was played at Adelaide Oval in front of a  home-crowd of 50,967. Despite Adelaide leading by 21 points at half-time, Port Adelaide managed to cut Adelaide's margin back to single figures with 5 minutes left in the third quarter. Robbie Gray kicked 2 goals late (his fourth and fifth of the quarter) to give Port Adelaide the lead at three-quarter time. The final quarter was largely played in Adelaide's forward half but they could not trouble the scoreboard. With less than three minutes to go, the game looked all-but over, but that was not the case. Adelaide managed three goals in little over 2 minutes to regain the lead with 42 seconds on the clock through a Mitch McGovern set shot. One last turn would see off-season Port Adelaide recruit Steven Motlop kick the winning goal with 21 seconds left. The celebration of Port Adelaide coach Ken Hinkley at the conclusion of the game, where he referenced the end of the Adelaide's five Showdown win streak, garnered significant media attention. Robbie Gray claimed a third Showdown Medal for his best on ground display. He managed 6 goals (5 of which in the third quarter).

Round 20, 2018 

Showdown 45 was a tight contest for the entire game apart from the opening where the Crows kicked the first three goals of the match. Second gamer Kane Farrell kicked three goals to close out the first interval with the quarter time scores level and the margin thereafter never again reaching three goals. Late in the final quarter Ollie Wines had the opportunity to seal the game with a set shot from a tight angle but his banana kick was ineffective. Minutes after Wines shot, Josh Jenkins snapped and his score was referred to the goal review umpire to clarify whether it hit the post. The score was quickly ruled a goal by the goal review umpire despite Josh Jenkins calling his teammates to set up for a kick out. He later stated his doubt in a post game interview. Robbie Gray was awarded a record fourth Showdown Medal becoming just the third player, after Graham Johncock and Shaun Burgoyne, to win the honour coming from the losing side. After the match Port Adelaide challenged the AFL Score Review system questioning the short amount of time taken for the review (23 seconds) and the lack of camera angles available to the umpires. The AFL affirmed the decision that it was a goal.

Round 3, 2022 
Showdown 51 was the first edition of the fixture to be played on Friday night, the AFL's marquee time-slot, although this match partially overlapped with a match between Melbourne and Essendon that was played simultaneously that night and was not broadcast free-to-air nationally. Entering the match both Adelaide and Port Adelaide were winless having lost their first two games. In the lead up to the game Adelaide director Mark Ricciuto publicly noted, regarding his players, that "They can't kick, they can't handball, they can't kick a goal, they've given away free kicks, they really can't do anything worse.” Also during the lead up to the game Kane Cornes called for Todd Marshall to be dropped from Port Adelaide's AFL side. Marshall would go on to kick a career best five goals during the match. Two minutes before the game ended Travis Boak had the opportunity to push the margin to 7 points but missed his shot, registering a behind and leaving the margin at two points. In the last minute of the game a late high contact free kick was paid to Lachlan Murphy against Port Adelaide's Sam Mayes approximately 45m out from goal. Murphy was unable to take the kick and the set shot was given to Jordan Dawson meaning that a kick after the siren would be required for Adelaide to win the game. The kick looked like it was heading straight for a behind until it swung left very late, going through for a goal. Dawson's goal gave the Crows their first win after the siren since Rod Jameson kicked the winner in 1991 against Fitzroy after the siren to win the game. This was also the first time that a Showdown had been decided after the siren.

Results 
The two clubs sometimes meet in preseason fixtures, such as the first meeting between the two clubs in 1992, however these are not official Showdowns and do not contribute to the official statistics of the fixture. While the AFL draw is not a complete double round robin it is designed each year to include two Showdowns in recognition of its significance and gate drawing power. For the 2020 season only, there was only one Showdown due to the premiership season being shortened to 17 rounds due to the COVID-19 pandemic.

Men's 

|- style=";background:#ccf;font-size: 110%" 
| 
| Year
| Date
|Timeslot
| 
| Home Team
| 
| Away Team
| 
| Ground
| Crowd
| Result/Winner
|
|
|
|- style="background:#fff;font-size: 80%;"
| 1
| rowspan="2" style="text-align: center;"|1997 ⚑
| 20/4
|style="background:#FFC7CE"|Sun 3:10
| 4
|  Adelaide
| 11.6 (72)
| style="background:#cfc;"|  Port Adelaide
| style="background:#cfc;"|11.17 (83)
| rowspan="35"|Football Park
| 47,256
| style="background:black; color:white; border: solid #06AAC5 2px; text-align:center;" |
!11
!L
| style="background:black; color:white; border: solid #06AAC5 2px; text-align:center;" |
|- style="background:#fff;font-size: 80%;"
| 2
| 10/8 
|style="background:#FFC7CE"|Sun 3:10
| 19
|  Port Adelaide
| 9.4 (58)
| style="background:#cfc;"|  Adelaide
| style="background:#cfc;"| 9.11 (65)
| 45,498
| style="background:Red ; color: Gold; border: solid #000066 2px; text-align:center;" |
!7
!W
|
|- style="background:#fff;font-size: 80%;"
| 3
| rowspan="2" style="text-align: center;"|1998 ⚑
|19/4 
|Sun 2:10
| 4
| style="background:#cfc;"|  Port Adelaide
| style="background:#cfc;"| 11.7 (73)
|  Adelaide
| 8.16 (64)
| 41,476
| style="background:black; color:white; border: solid #06AAC5 2px; text-align:center;" |
!9
!L
| style="background:black; color:white; border: solid #06AAC5 2px; text-align:center;" |
|- style="background:#fff;font-size: 80%;"
| 4
| 9/8
|style="background:#FFC7CE"|Sun 3:20
| 19
| style="background:#cfc;"|  Adelaide
| style="background:#cfc;"|22.12 (144)
|  Port Adelaide
| 10.10 (70)
| 46,405
| style="background:Red ; color: Gold; border: solid #000066 2px; text-align:center;" |
!74
!W
|
|- style="background:#fff;font-size: 80%;"
| 5
| rowspan="2" style="text-align: center;"|1999
|2/5 
|Sun 2:10
| 6
| style="background:#cfc;"|  Adelaide
| style="background:#cfc;"| 18.7 (115)
|  Port Adelaide
| 12.15 (87)
| 45,585
| style="background:Red ; color: Gold; border: solid #000066 2px; text-align:center;" |
!28
!W
| style="background:Red ; color: Gold; border: solid #000066 2px; text-align:center;" |
|- style="background:#fff;font-size: 80%;"
| 6
| 22/8 
|Sun 2:10
| 21
| style="background:#cfc;"|  Port Adelaide
| style="background:#cfc;"|13.14 (92)
|  Adelaide
| 9.14 (68)
| 42,669
| style="background:black; color:white; border: solid #06AAC5 2px; text-align:center;" |
!24
!W
|
|- style="background:#fff;font-size: 80%;"
| 7
|rowspan="2" style="text-align: center;"|2000
| 23/4 
|Sun 1:40
| 7
|  Port Adelaide
| 13.13 (91)
| style="background:#cfc;"|  Adelaide
| style="background:#cfc;"| 14.14 (98)
| 41,173
| style="background:Red ; color: Gold; border: solid #000066 2px; text-align:center;" |
!7
!W
| style="background:Red ; color: Gold; border: solid #000066 2px; text-align:center;" |
|- style="background:#fff;font-size: 80%;"
| 8
| 6/8 
|Sun 2:10
| 22
|  Adelaide
| 14.8 (92)
| style="background:#cfc;"|  Port Adelaide
| style="background:#cfc;"| 20.19 (139)
| 42,659
| style="background:black; color:white; border: solid #06AAC5 2px; text-align:center;" |
!47
!L
|
|- style="background:#fff;font-size: 80%;"
| 9
|rowspan="2" style="text-align: center;"|2001
| 15/4 
|Sun 1:40
| 3
|  Adelaide
| 13.10 (88)
| style="background:#cfc;"|  Port Adelaide
| style="background:#cfc;"|23.15 (153)
| 40,296
| style="background:black; color:white; border: solid #06AAC5 2px; text-align:center;" |
!65
!W
| style="background:black; color:white; border: solid #06AAC5 2px; text-align:center;" |
|- style="background:#fff;font-size: 80%;"
| 10
| 5/8 
|Sun 1:40
| 18
| style="background:#cfc;"|  Port Adelaide
| style="background:#cfc;"|16.11 (107)
|  Adelaide
| 15.9 (99)
| 49,846
| style="background:black; color:white; border: solid #06AAC5 2px; text-align:center;" |
!8
!W
| style="background:black; color:white; border: solid #06AAC5 2px; text-align:center;" |
|- style="background:#fff;font-size: 80%;"
| 11
|rowspan="2" style="text-align: center;"|2002
| 27/4 
|style="background:#ffffa6;"|Sat 7:10
| 5
|  Adelaide
| 12.10 (82)
| style="background:#cfc;"|  Port Adelaide
| style="background:#cfc;"| 14.6 (90)
| 49,513
| style="background:black; color:white; border: solid #06AAC5 2px; text-align:center;" |
!8
!L
| style="background:black; color:white; border: solid #06AAC5 2px; text-align:center;" |
|- style="background:#fff;font-size: 80%;"
| 12
| 18/8 
|Sun 2:10
| 20
| style="background:#cfc;"|  Port Adelaide
| style="background:#cfc;"|12.12 (84)
|  Adelaide
| 11.10 (76)
| style="background:#ffffa6;"| 50,275
| style="background:black; color:white; border: solid #06AAC5 2px; text-align:center;" |
!8
!W
| style="background:black; color:white; border: solid #06AAC5 2px; text-align:center;" |
|- style="background:#fff;font-size: 80%;"
| 13
|rowspan="2" style="text-align: center;"|2003
| 26/4 
|style="background:#ffffa6;"|Sat 7:10
| 5
|  Adelaide
| 9.12 (66)
| style="background:#cfc;"|  Port Adelaide
| style="background:#cfc;"|12.6 (78)
| style="background:#ffffa6;"|51,140
| style="background:black; color:white; border: solid #06AAC5 2px; text-align:center;" |
!12
!L
| style="background:black; color:white; border: solid #06AAC5 2px; text-align:center;" |
|- style="background:#fff;font-size: 80%;"
| 14
| 31/8 
|Sun 1:10
| 22
| style="background:#cfc;"|  Port Adelaide
| style="background:#cfc;"| 14.10 (94)
|  Adelaide
| 12.6 (78)
| 48,131
| style="background:black; color:white; border: solid #06AAC5 2px; text-align:center;" |
!16
!W
| style="background:black; color:white; border: solid #06AAC5 2px; text-align:center;" |
|- style="background:#fff;font-size: 80%;"
| 15
| rowspan="2" style="text-align: center;"|2004 ⚑
| 8/5 
|style="background:#ffffa6;"|Sat 7:10
| 7
|  Port Adelaide
| 13.9 (87)
| style="background:#cfc;"|  Adelaide
| style="background:#cfc;"| 17.17 (119)
| 44,733
| style="background:Red ; color: Gold; border: solid #000066 2px; text-align:center;" |
!32
!L
| style="background:black; color:white; border: solid #06AAC5 2px; text-align:center;" |
|- style="background:#fff;font-size: 80%;"
| 16
| 29/8 
|Sun 12:40
| 22
|  Adelaide
|9.6 (60)
| style="background:#cfc;"|  Port Adelaide
| style="background:#cfc;"| 12.13 (85)
| 45,473
| style="background:black; color:white; border: solid #06AAC5 2px; text-align:center;" |
!25
!W
| style="background:black; color:white; border: solid #06AAC5 2px; text-align:center;" |
|- style="background:#fff;font-size: 80%;"
| 17
|rowspan="3" style="text-align: center;"|2005
| 10/4 
|Sun 12:40
| 3
| style="background:#cfc;"|  Adelaide
| style="background:#cfc;"|18.16 (124)
|  Port Adelaide
| 8.8 (56)
| 44,807
| style="background:Red ; color: Gold; border: solid #000066 2px; text-align:center;" |
!68
!W
| style="background:black; color:white; border: solid #06AAC5 2px; text-align:center;" |
|- style="background:#fff;font-size: 80%;"
| 18
| 13/8 
|style="background:#ffffa6;"|Sat 7:10
| 20
|  Port Adelaide
| 12.9 (81)
| style="background:#cfc;"|  Adelaide
| style="background:#cfc;"| 13.10 (88)
| 45,199
| style="background:Red ; color: Gold; border: solid #000066 2px; text-align:center;" |
!7
!W
| style="background:black; color:white; border: solid #06AAC5 2px; text-align:center;" |
|- style="background:#fff;font-size: 80%;"
| 19
| 10/9 
|style="background:#ffffa6;"|Sat 7:00
| style="background:gold;"| 
| style="background:#cfc;"|  Adelaide
| style="background:#cfc;"| 18.15 (123)
|  Port Adelaide
|5.10 (40)
| style="background:#ffffa6;"|50,521
| style="background:Red ; color: Gold; border: solid #000066 2px; text-align:center;" |
!83
!W
| style="background:black; color:white; border: solid #06AAC5 2px; text-align:center;" |
|- style="background:#fff;font-size: 80%;"
| 20
|rowspan="2" style="text-align: center;"|2006
| 6/5 
|style="background:#ffffa6;"|Sat 7:10
| 6
| style="background:#cfc;"|  Adelaide
| style="background:#cfc;"|15.13 (103)
|  Port Adelaide
| 8.5 (53)
| 42,723
| style="background:Red ; color: Gold; border: solid #000066 2px; text-align:center;" |
!50
!W
| style="background:black; color:white; border: solid #06AAC5 2px; text-align:center;" |
|- style="background:#fff;font-size: 80%;"
| 21
| 27/8 
|Sun 12:40
| 21
| style="background:#cfc;"|  Port Adelaide
| style="background:#cfc;"| 14.11 (95)
|  Adelaide
| 11.15 (81)
| 41,549
| style="background:black; color:white; border: solid #06AAC5 2px; text-align:center;" |
!14
!L
| style="background:black; color:white; border: solid #06AAC5 2px; text-align:center;" |
|- style="background:#fff;font-size: 80%;"
| 22
|rowspan="2" style="text-align: center;"|2007
| 14/4 
|style="background:#FFC7CE"|Sat 2:40
| 3
|  Port Adelaide
| 8.15 (63)
| style="background:#cfc;"|  Adelaide
| style="background:#cfc;"| 13.9 (87)
| 36,959
| style="background:Red ; color: Gold; border: solid #000066 2px; text-align:center;" |
!24
!L
| style="background:black; color:white; border: solid #06AAC5 2px; text-align:center;" |
|- style="background:#fff;font-size: 80%;"
| 23
| 4/8 
|style="background:#ffffa6;"|Sat 7:10
| 18
| style="background:#cfc;"|  Adelaide
| style="background:#cfc;"| 9.19 (73)
|  Port Adelaide
| 10.5 (65)
| 42,335
| style="background:Red ; color: Gold; border: solid #000066 2px; text-align:center;" |
!8
!L
| style="background:black; color:white; border: solid #06AAC5 2px; text-align:center;" |
|- style="background:#fff;font-size: 80%;"
| 24
|rowspan="2" style="text-align: center;"|2008
| 6/4 
|style="background:#FFC7CE"|Sun 4:10
| 3
| style="background:#cfc;"|  Adelaide
| style="background:#cfc;"| 12.13 (85)
|  Port Adelaide
| 11.13 (79)
| 45,524
| style="background:Red ; color: Gold; border: solid #000066 2px; text-align:center;" |
!6
!W
|
|- style="background:#fff;font-size: 80%;"
| 25
| 20/7 
|style="background:#FFC7CE"|Sun 2:40
| 16
| style="background:#cfc;"|  Port Adelaide
| style="background:#cfc;"|13.14 (92)
|  Adelaide
| 11.14 (80)
| 31,662
| style="background:black; color:white; border: solid #06AAC5 2px; text-align:center;" |
!12
!L
| style="background:black; color:white; border: solid #06AAC5 2px; text-align:center;" |
|- style="background:#fff;font-size: 80%;"
| 26
|rowspan="2" style="text-align: center;"|2009
| 2/5 
|style="background:#ffffa6;"|Sat 7:10
| 6
| style="background:#cfc;"|  Port Adelaide
| style="background:#cfc;"| 15.15 (105)
|  Adelaide
| 12.7 (79)
| 41,558
| style="background:black; color:white; border: solid #06AAC5 2px; text-align:center;" |
!26
!W
| style="background:black; color:white; border: solid #06AAC5 2px; text-align:center;" |
|- style="background:#fff;font-size: 80%;"
| 27
| 26/7 
|style="background:#FFC7CE"|Sun 4:10
| 17
| style="background:#cfc;"|  Adelaide
| style="background:#cfc;"|19.18 (132)
|  Port Adelaide
| 9.8 (62)
| 46,859
| style="background:Red ; color: Gold; border: solid #000066 2px; text-align:center;" |
!70
!W
| style="background:black; color:white; border: solid #06AAC5 2px; text-align:center;" |
|- style="background:#fff;font-size: 80%;"
| 28
|rowspan="2" style="text-align: center;"|2010
| 1/5 
|style="background:#FFC7CE"|Sat 2:40
| 6
|  Adelaide
| 10.14 (74)
| style="background:#cfc;"|  Port Adelaide
| style="background:#cfc;"| 14.13 (97)
| 40,371
| style="background:black; color:white; border: solid #06AAC5 2px; text-align:center;" |
!23
!W
| style="background:black; color:white; border: solid #06AAC5 2px; text-align:center;" |
|- style="background:#fff;font-size: 80%;"
| 29
| 25/7 
|style="background:#FFC7CE"|Sun 4:10
| 17
| style="background:#cfc;"|  Port Adelaide
| style="background:#cfc;"|13.10 (88)
|  Adelaide
| 9.15 (69)
| 36,788
| style="background:black; color:white; border: solid #06AAC5 2px; text-align:center;" |
!19
!L
| style="background:black; color:white; border: solid #06AAC5 2px; text-align:center;" |
|- style="background:#fff;font-size: 80%;"
| 30
|rowspan="2" style="text-align: center;"|2011
| 16/4 
|style="background:#ffffa6;"|Sat 7:10
| 4
| style="background:#cfc;"|  Port Adelaide
| style="background:#cfc;"| 14.14 (98)
|  Adelaide
| 9.12 (66)
| 33,143
| style="background:black; color:white; border: solid #06AAC5 2px; text-align:center;" |
!32
!L
| style="background:black; color:white; border: solid #06AAC5 2px; text-align:center;" |
|- style="background:#fff;font-size: 80%;"
| 31
| 31/7 
|style="background:#FFC7CE"|Sun 4:10
| 19
| style="background:#cfc;"|  Adelaide
| style="background:#cfc;"| 16.15 (111)
|  Port Adelaide
| 11.13 (79)
| 40,586
| style="background:Red ; color: Gold; border: solid #000066 2px; text-align:center;" |
!32
!W
| style="background:black; color:white; border: solid #06AAC5 2px; text-align:center;" |
|- style="background:#fff;font-size: 80%;"
| 32
|rowspan="2" style="text-align: center;"|2012
| 29/4 
|style="background:#FFC7CE"|Sun 4:10
| 5
| style="background:#cfc;"|  Adelaide
| style="background:#cfc;"| 16.14 (110)
|   Port Adelaide
| 14.7 (91)
| 41,649
| style="background:Red ; color: Gold; border: solid #000066 2px; text-align:center;" |
!19
!W
| style="background:black; color:white; border: solid #06AAC5 2px; text-align:center;" |
|- style="background:#fff;font-size: 80%;"
| 33
| 7/7 
|style="background:#ffffa6;"|Sat 7:10
| 15
|   Port Adelaide
| 8.10 (58)
| style="background:#cfc;"|  Adelaide
| style="background:#cfc;"| 17.14 (116)
| 34,829
| style="background:Red ; color: Gold; border: solid #000066 2px; text-align:center;" |
!58
!W
| style="background:black; color:white; border: solid #06AAC5 2px; text-align:center;" |
|- style="background:#fff;font-size: 80%;"
| 34
|rowspan="2" style="text-align: center;"|2013
| 14/4 
|style="background:#FFC7CE"|Sun 4:10
| 3
| style="background:#cfc;"|  Port Adelaide
| style="background:#cfc;"| 17.16 (118)
|  Adelaide
| 16.13 (109)
| 40,707
| style="background:black; color:white; border: solid #06AAC5 2px; text-align:center;" |
!9
!W
| style="background:black; color:white; border: solid #06AAC5 2px; text-align:center;" |
|- style="background:#fff;font-size: 80%;"
| 35
| 4/8 
|style="background:#FFC7CE"|Sun 2:50
| 19
|  Adelaide
| 15.13 (103)
| style="background:#cfc;"|   Port Adelaide
| style="background:#cfc;"| 17.5 (107)
| 43,368
| style="background:black; color:white; border: solid #06AAC5 2px; text-align:center;" |
!4
!W
| style="background:black; color:white; border: solid #06AAC5 2px; text-align:center;" |
|- style="background:#fff;font-size: 80%;"
| 36
|rowspan="2" style="text-align: center;"|2014
| 29/3 
|style="background:#FFC7CE"|Sat 4:15
| 2
| style="background:#cfc;"|   Port Adelaide
| style="background:#cfc;"| 19.14 (128)
|  Adelaide
| 11.7 (73)
| rowspan="17"| Adelaide Oval
| style="background:#ffffa6;"|50,397
| style="background:black; color:white; border: solid #06AAC5 2px; text-align:center;" |
!55
!W
| style="background:black; color:white; border: solid #06AAC5 2px; text-align:center;" |
|- style="background:#fff;font-size: 80%;"
| 37
| 29/6
|style="background:#FFC7CE"|Sun 3:40
| 15
| style="background:#cfc;"|  Adelaide
| style="background:#cfc;"| 14.15 (99)
|   Port Adelaide
| 10.16 (76) 
| style="background:#ffffa6;"|50,552
| style="background:Red ; color: Gold; border: solid #000066 2px; text-align:center;" |
!23
!L
| style="background:black; color:white; border: solid #06AAC5 2px; text-align:center;" |
|- style="background:#fff;font-size: 80%;"
| 38
|rowspan="2" style="text-align: center;"|2015
| 3/5
|style="background:#FFC7CE"|Sun 4:10
| 5
|  Adelaide
| 13.13 (91)
| style="background:#cfc;"|  Port Adelaide
| style="background:#cfc;"| 18.7 (115)
| 49,735
| style="background:black; color:white; border: solid #06AAC5 2px; text-align:center;" |
!24
!L
| style="background:black; color:white; border: solid #06AAC5 2px; text-align:center;" |
|- style="background:#fff;font-size: 80%;"
| 39
| 19/7
|style="background:#FFC7CE"|Sun 2:50
| 16
|  Port Adelaide
| 17.11 (113)
| style="background:#cfc;"|  Adelaide
| style="background:#cfc;"| 18.8 (116)
| style="background:#ffffa6;"| 53,518
| style="background:Red ; color: Gold; border: solid #000066 2px; text-align:center;" |
| style="background:#ffffa6; text-align:center;"|3
!W
| style="background:black; color:white; border: solid #06AAC5 2px; text-align:center;" |
|- style="background:#fff;font-size: 80%;"
| 40
|rowspan="2" style="text-align: center;"|2016
| 2/4
|Sat 1:15
| 2
| style="background:#cfc;"|  Adelaide
| style="background:#cfc;"| 22.12 (144)
|  Port Adelaide
| 11.20 (86)
| style="background:#ffffa6;"|50,555
| style="background:Red ; color: Gold; border: solid #000066 2px; text-align:center;" |
!58
!L
| style="background:black; color:white; border: solid #06AAC5 2px; text-align:center;" |
|- style="background:#fff;font-size: 80%;"
| 41
| 20/8 
|style="background:#ffffa6;"|Sat 7:10
| 22
|   Port Adelaide
| 14.10 (94)
| style="background:#cfc;"|  Adelaide
| style="background:#cfc;"|15.19 (109)
|49,541
| style="background:Red ; color: Gold; border: solid #000066 2px; text-align:center;" |
!15
!W
| style="background:black; color:white; border: solid #06AAC5 2px; text-align:center;" |
|- style="background:#fff;font-size: 80%;"
|42
| rowspan="2" style="text-align: center;"|2017
|8/4
|style="background:#ffffa6;"|Sat 7:10
|3
|  Port Adelaide
| 12.11 (83)
| style="background:#cfc;"|  Adelaide
| style="background:#cfc;"|15.10 (100)
| style="background:Gold;"| 53,698
| style="background:Red ; color: Gold; border: solid #000066 2px; text-align:center;" |
!17
!L
|
|- style="background:#fff;font-size: 80%;"
|43
|6/8
|style="background:#FFC7CE"|Sun 4:10
|20
| style="background:#cfc;"|  Adelaide
| style="background:#cfc;"|18.22 (130)
|  Port Adelaide
| 7.4 (46)
| 45,028
| style="background:Red ; color: Gold; border: solid #000066 2px; text-align:center;" |
| style="background:gold;"|84
!W
| style="background:Red ; color: Gold; border: solid #000066 2px; text-align:center;" |
|- style="background:#fff;font-size: 80%;"
|44
|rowspan="2" style="text-align: center;"|2018
|12/5
|style="background:#FFC7CE"|Sat 4:40
|8
| style="background:#cfc;"|   Port Adelaide
| style="background:#cfc;"|14.11 (95)
|  Adelaide
| 14.6 (90)
| style="background:#ffffa6;"|50,967
| style="background:black; color:white; border: solid #06AAC5 2px; text-align:center;" |
! 5
! L
| 
|- style="background:#fff;font-size: 80%;"
|45
|4/8
|style="background:#FFC7CE"|Sat 4:05
|20
| style="background:#cfc;"|  Adelaide
| style="background:#cfc;"|13.18 (96)
|  Port Adelaide
| 14.9 (93)
| style="background:#ffffa6;"|50,377
| style="background:Red ; color: Gold; border: solid #000066 2px; text-align:center;" |
| style="background:#ffffa6; text-align:center;"|3
! L
| style="background:Red ; color: Gold; border: solid #000066 2px; text-align:center;" |
|- style="background:#fff;font-size: 87%;"
|- style="background:#fff;font-size: 80%;"
|46
|rowspan="2" style="text-align: center;"|2019
|11/5
|style="background:#ffffa6"|Sat 7:10
|8
|  Port Adelaide
| 9.14 (68)
| style="background:#cfc;"|  Adelaide
| style="background:#cfc;"|13.10 (88)
| 49,675
| style="background:Red ; color: Gold; border: solid #000066 2px; text-align:center;" |
! 20
! W
| style="background:Red ; color: Gold; border: solid #000066 2px; text-align:center;" |
|- style="background:#fff;font-size: 87%;"
|- style="background:#fff;font-size: 80%;"
|47
|6/7
|style="background:#FFC7CE"|Sat 4:05
|16
|  Adelaide
| 5.14 (44)
| style="background:#cfc;"|  Port Adelaide
| style="background:#cfc;"| 15.11 (101)
| style="background:#ffffa6;"|50,544
| style="background:black; color:white; border: solid #06AAC5 2px; text-align:center;" |
!57
!L
|style="background:Red ; color: Gold; border: solid #000066 2px; text-align:center;" |
|-
|- style="background:#fff;font-size: 87%;"
|- style="background:#fff;font-size: 80%;"
|48
|rowspan="1" style="text-align: center;"|2020
|13/6
|style="background:#ffffa6;"|Sat 7:10
|2
| style="background:#cfc;"|  Port Adelaide
| style="background:#cfc;"|17.8 (110)
|  Adelaide
|5.5 (35)
|style="background:#FFC7CE"|2,240
|style="background:black; color:white; border: solid #06AAC5 2px; text-align:center;" |
!75
!W
|
|- style="background:#fff;font-size: 80%;"
| 49
| rowspan="2" style="text-align: center;"|2021
|8/5
|style="background:#ffffa6;"|Sat 7:10
| 8
| style="background:#cfc;"|  Port Adelaide
| style="background:#cfc;"|12.15 (87)
|  Adelaide
| 5.8 (38)
| 43,069
| style="background:black; color:white; border: solid #06AAC5 2px; text-align:center;" |
!49
!W
|style="background:black; color:white; border: solid #06AAC5 2px; text-align:center;" |
|- style="background:#fff;font-size: 80%;"
|50
|7/8
|style="background:#ffffa6;"|Sat 7:10
| 21
|  Adelaide
|7.9 (51)
| style="background:#cfc;"|  Port Adelaide
|style="background:#cfc;"|7.13 (55)
|14,376
| style="background:black; color:white; border: solid #06AAC5 2px; text-align:center;" |
!4 
!W
|style="background:black; color:white; border: solid #06AAC5 2px; text-align:center;" |
|- style="background:#fff;font-size: 80%;"
|51
|rowspan="2" style="text-align: center;"|2022
|1/4
|style="background:gold;"|Fri 7:50
| 3
| style="background:#cfc;"|  Adelaide
| style="background:#cfc;"|15.6 (96)
| Port Adelaide
|13.14 (92)
|39,190
| style="background:Red ; color: Gold; border: solid #000066 2px; text-align:center;" |
!4 
!W
|style="background:black; color:white; border: solid #06AAC5 2px; text-align:center;" |
|- style="background:#fff;font-size: 80%;"
|52
|20/8
|style="background:#ffffa6;"|Sat 7:00
| 23
| style="background:#cfc;"|  Port Adelaide
| style="background:#cfc;"|16.15 (111)
| Adelaide
|7.13 (55)
| style="background:#ffffa6;"|50,090
| style="background:black; color:white; border: solid #06AAC5 2px; text-align:center;" |
!56
!W
|style="background:black; color:white; border: solid #06AAC5 2px; text-align:center;" |
|- style="background:#fff;font-size: 80%;"

Women's 

|- style=";background:#ccf;font-size: 100%" 
| 
| Year
| Date
|Timeslot
| 
| Home Team
| 
| Away Team
| 
| Ground
| Crowd
| Winner
|
|
|
|- style="background:#fff;font-size: 80%;"
| 1
| style="text-align: center;" |2022
| 30/9
|style="background:#ffffa6;"|Fri 7:30
| 6
|   Port Adelaide
| 0.3 (3)
| style="background:#cfc;"| Adelaide
| style="background:#cfc;"|8.15 (63)
| rowspan="34" |Adelaide Oval
| 20,652
| style="background:Red ; color: Gold; border: solid #000066 2px; text-align:center;" |
!60
!W
| style="background:Red ; color: Gold; border: solid #000066 2px; text-align:center;" |

Showdown Medal 
The Showdown Medal is the medal awarded to the player adjudged best on ground in the Showdown AFL match.

Shared history

Shared players 
Below is a list of players who have played a senior game of football representing both the Adelaide Football Club and Port Adelaide Football Club.
Only two players, Matthew Bode and Brett Chalmers, have appeared in Showdowns for both clubs.

Men

Women

AFL trades 
Below is a list of AFL sanctioned trades between the two clubs. Only four trades have ever been orchestrated between the two clubs. There were no trades for ten years between 2008 and 2018.

Attendances and timeslots 

The Showdown has the highest average attendances of all intrastate derby matches.

In the 45 Showdowns to 2018, a total of 2,017,918 people have attended the matches: an average attendance per match of 44,893.

The record attendance in a Showdown was 53,698 in Showdown XLII (round 3, 2017, a Port Adelaide home match). The lowest attendance was 2,240 in Showdown XLVIII (round 2, 2020, a Port Adelaide home match), due to the impacts of the COVID-19 pandemic at the time. Showdown XXV (Round 16, 2008, a Port Adelaide home match), which drew a crowd of 31,662, is the lowest attended Showdown that was not impacted by COVID-19.

A total of 1,053,674 people have attended Adelaide's 23 home Showdowns (including the 2005 Semi Final), an average of 45,812. Their attendances have ranged from 40,296 (Showdown IX) to 51,140 (Showdown XIII).

A total of 966,484 people have attended Port Adelaide's 23 home Showdowns, an average of 42,021. Their attendances range from 2,240 (Showdown XLVIII) to 53,698 (Showdown XLII).

Minor round fixturing 
Due to the length of the AFL premiership season requiring five double up matches and the commercial strength of the Showdown there have always been two Showdown's fixtured for the minor round, with the exception of 2020 which saw only one Showdown scheduled due to the COVID-19 pandemic. Generally the gap between the two Showdown fixtures is maximised to preserve the games reverence.

Highest attendances 

|- style="background:#ccf;"
|#
| width=45 | Crowd
| Year
| Date
| 
| Hosting club
| Ground
|- style="background:#fff;"
|42
| style="background:gold;"|  53,698
| style="text-align:center;"|2017
| 8/4 
| 3
| Port Adelaide
| Adelaide Oval
|- style="background:#fff;"
|39
| style="background:#ffffa6;"|53,518
| style="text-align:center;"|2015
| 19/7 
| 16
| Port Adelaide
| Adelaide Oval
|- style="background:#fff;"
|13
| style="background:#ffffa6;"| 51,140
| style="text-align:center;"|2003
| 26/4
| 5
| Adelaide
| Football Park
|- style="background:#fff;"
|44
| style="background:#ffffa6;"|50,967
| style="text-align:center;"|2018
| 12/5 
| 8
| Port Adelaide
| Adelaide Oval
|-style="background:#fff;"
|40
|style="background:#ffffa6;"|50,555
|style="text-align:center;"|2016
|2/4
|2
|Adelaide
|Adelaide Oval
|- style="background:#fff;"
|47
| style="background:#ffffa6;"| 50,554
| style="text-align:center;"|2019
| 6/7 
| 16
| Adelaide
| Adelaide Oval
|- style="background:#fff;"
|37
| style="background:#ffffa6;"|50,552
| style="text-align:center;"|2014
| 29/6
| 15
| Adelaide
| Adelaide Oval
|- style="background:#fff;"
|19
| style="background:#ffffa6;"|50,521
| style="text-align:center;"|2005
| 10/9 
| style="background:gold;"| 
| Adelaide
| Football Park
|- style="background:#fff;"
|36
| style="background:#ffffa6;"|50,397
| style="text-align:center;"|2014
| 29/3 
| 2
| Port Adelaide
| Adelaide Oval
|- style="background:#fff;"
|45
| style="background:#ffffa6;"|50,377
| style="text-align:center;"|2018
| 4/8 
| 20
| Adelaide
| Adelaide Oval

Club records

Highest score 
Highest score in a Showdown.

Lowest score 
Lowest score for each club in all Showdowns.

Greatest winning margins 
Greatest winning margin for each club in the Showdown.

Smallest winning margins 
Smallest winning margin for each club in the Showdown.

Winning streak

Clean sweeps 
Seasons when one club has won all Showdown fixtures. There was only one Showdown in 2020 due to the COVID-19 pandemic.

1Includes the 2005 semi-final. This is the only (as of 2020) time that either side has won all three Showdowns in the one season (including finals).

Player records

Games played

Goalkickers

Most goals kicked in one Showdown

Most Showdown career goals

Career Brownlow votes

Disposals

Most career Showdown disposals

Most disposals in one Showdown

Hitouts

Most career Showdown hitouts

Most Hitouts in one Showdown

Clearances

Most career Showdown clearances

Most clearances in a Showdown

Contested possessions

Most career Showdown contested possessions

Most contested possessions in one Showdown

Contested Marks

Most career Showdown contested marks

Most contested marks in one Showdown

Tackles

Most career Showdown tackles

Most tackles in one Showdown

Player winning record 
Showdown players ranked by win percentage (minimum 10 Showdowns).

Coaching records 
Showdown coaches are ranked by total wins followed by win percentage.

Showdown coaching record (Men)

Showdown coaching record (Women)

Naming rights sponsors 
Since the first Showdown in 1997 the fixture has always had a naming rights sponsor.

West End 
The first naming rights sponsor was the South Australian Brewing Company (SABC) who utilised the fixture to promote West End Draught. SABC was responsible for the coining of the 'Showdown' name for the rivalry.

Balfours 
Balfours, a South Australian wholesale bakery, became the naming rights sponsor for the Showdown in 2008. As part of their efforts in promoting the game Balfours began, and continue, to produce donuts in the colors of the two competing teams.

Variety 
Variety, a charity for disadvantaged children, became the current naming rights sponsor for the Showdown in 2018.

Spin offs

Cricket 

Two Showdowns have taken place as Twenty20 cricket matches doubling as charity fundraisers for bushfire relief. In 2009, the two clubs played at Football Park what was dubbed as SA Footy's Bushfire Bash For Cash. In the aftermath of the 2019–20 Australian bushfire season which severely impacted Kangaroo Island and parts of the Adelaide Hills, the two clubs played another such game, this time at Adelaide Oval. Dubbed the Bushfire T20 Showdown, it also included members of the Adelaide Strikers of the Big Bash League including Australian internationals Alex Carey and Kane Richardson and Afghan international Rashid Khan participating. The game proved a success with 34,219 spectators collectively raising $1,015,239 by the end of the match for the South Australian Bushfire Appeal. Seven Network broadcast the match with commentators including James Brayshaw, Greg Blewett, Mark Soderstrom and Jason Gillespie.

Slowdown 

A charity spin off of the Showdown also included an annual 'Slowdown' that raised money for various charities. Slowdown's often featured retired Adelaide, Port Adelaide and SANFL players along with local celebrities.

See also
 Port Adelaide-Norwood SANFL rivalry
 1990 SANFL Grand Final
 West End Slowdown
 Western Derby: The AFL Intrastate Derby of Western Australia, first played in 1995. (West Coast Eagles Vs. Fremantle Dockers).
 QClash: The AFL intrastate Derby of Queensland, first played in 2011. (Brisbane Lions Vs. Gold Coast Suns)
 Sydney Derby: The AFL Intrastate Derby of New South Wales, first played in 2012. (Sydney Swans Vs. Greater Western Sydney Giants).

References

Australian Football League games
Australian Football League rivalries
Adelaide Football Club
Port Adelaide Football Club
Sport in Adelaide
Australian rules football in South Australia
1997 establishments in Australia
Recurring sporting events established in 1997